Stand Tall is a 1997 documentary film about bodybuilding.  It centers on Lou Ferrigno's battle with hearing loss and his rise to prominence on the world bodybuilding stage.  Bodybuilding legends Joe Weider and Arnold Schwarzenegger also appear in the film, as well as notable bodybuilders like Robby Robinson.

External links

1997 films
Documentary films about bodybuilding
1997 documentary films
Documentary films about sportspeople with disability
Deaf culture in the United States
1997 in bodybuilding
1990s English-language films